The A36 autoroute is a toll motorway in northeastern France connecting the German border with Burgundy.  It is also known as La Comtoise. The road forms part of European route E60.

Junctions

External links
 A36 Motorway in Saratlas

A36